Aubrey Victor George  Cleall  (1898–1982) was Archdeacon of Colchester from 1959 to 1969.

Born in Crewkerne on 9 December  1898, he was educated at Selwyn College, Cambridge, and  ordained in 1925.  After a curacy in his home town he was Vicar of Waltham Abbey  from  1929 until his appointment as archdeacon.

He died on 6 May 1982. There is a memorial to him in South Perrott parish church.

Notes

1898 births
People from Crewkerne
Alumni of Selwyn College, Cambridge
Archdeacons of Colchester
1982 deaths